Clementine Ford is an Australian feminist writer, broadcaster and public speaker. She wrote a regular column for Daily Life for seven years.

Personal life
Ford spent much of her childhood growing up in the Middle East, specifically in Oman on the eastern border of the United Arab Emirates. At the age of twelve, her family relocated to England. Ford spent the remainder of her teenage years growing up in Adelaide, South Australia. As a teenager, she struggled with body image, body dysmorphia and an eating disorder.

Ford studied at the University of Adelaide, where she took a gender studies course; she describes this as a personal catalyst for her decision to become a women's rights activist. During her time at the university she also worked as an editor and contributor for the student newspaper On Dit.

Ford moved from Adelaide to Melbourne in 2011. She announced the birth of her son in August 2016.

Career 
In 2007 Ford began writing a column for Adelaide's Sunday Mail, and she also began writing for the Drum. Topics Ford wrote about included distigmatising abortion; she described having an abortion herself as an easy decision that she feels no shame for. In 2014, she wrote of her outrage towards comments made by Cory Bernardi that labelled pro-choice advocates "pro-death" soldiers of the "death industry". Later that year, she wrote an opinion piece against a Victorian bill that would change the state's abortion laws, arguing that if politicians really cared about the lives of women and girls, they would advocate for improved access to birth control, including terminations.

On White Ribbon Day in 2015, Ford made public some of the sexist and abusive messages that she had received online. Meriton Group, the employer of a man who had labelled Ford with a derogatory term, investigated Ford's complaint and the man was dismissed from his job. Three Adelaide High School boys were suspended from their school for lewd comments they wrote about Ford.

In September 2016, Allen & Unwin published Ford's first book, Fight Like a Girl. Two years later, her second book, Boys Will Be Boys was published, which focused on toxic masculinity and the patriarchy.

Ford resigned from her role as a columnist with The Sydney Morning Herald and The Age in January 2019, alleging that she had been "disciplined over a tweet" she made in regard to the Prime Minister, Scott Morrison, and that she had been told that it was the paper's policy to refrain from "disrespect[ing] the office of the PM".

In February 2020, Ford began a podcast called "Big Sister Hotline" where she talks about current feminist issues and questions with guests such as: Florence Given, Salma El-Werdany, Gemma Carey, Aileen Quinn and Yasmin Abdel-Magied.

Controversy
In March 2016, Ford was banned from Facebook for 30 days for using profanity toward another user who had verbally abused her on her Facebook page. Ford accused Facebook of having a double standard, as the social networking site meanwhile declined to take action against a user who had posted a graphic internet meme making light of domestic violence. 

In 2018, a Lifeline event featuring Ford was cancelled following a petition calling for her removal, after she had made a Twitter comment which included the phrase "all men must die". Ford has commented on the issue of her sarcastic tweets being taken seriously by those opposing her. For example, after the man from Meriton Group was dismissed from his employment, another man tweeted that Ford would not be happy until she had all men "fired". Ford responded by saying she would not be happy until all men were "fired ... into the sun". According to Ford, despite the clear jest, many men publicly accused her tweet of advocating for their mass murder.

In May 2020, Ford was criticised for her tweet stating that the coronavirus was not "killing men fast enough", which has since been deleted. A Melbourne City Council arts grant that had been awarded to Ford was afterwards said to be "under review" as a result of Ford's comments. Lord Mayor Sally Capp stated that Ford's statement was "deliberately divisive and incredibly unhelpful when we are trying to keep our community together" during the COVID-19 pandemic. Following backlash, Ford responded on Twitter by stating that although she still stood "100% behind my fury at men exploiting women's unpaid labour", she had "reconsidered her flippancy in discussing it", and was "a big enough person to admit when [she'd] misjudged something".

Bibliography

Nonfiction

Contributed chapter 
"There's Nothing Funny About Misogyny", pp. 189–197, in: Destroying the Joint, edited by Jane Caro, Read How You Want (2015).

Introduction 
Stopes, Marie. Married Love: A New Contribution to the Solution of Sex Difficulties: A Book for Married Couples, Brunswick: Scribe Publications (2013)

References

External links 

Living people
1981 births
Australian feminist writers
Place of birth missing (living people)
University of Adelaide alumni
Australian abortion-rights activists
Writers from Adelaide
Date of birth missing (living people)